Shimura (written: 志村 or 紫村) is a Japanese surname. Notable people with the surname include:

, Japanese mathematician
Shimura correspondence
Eichler–Shimura congruence relation
Shimura variety
, Japanese hurdler
, Japanese comedian and actor
, Japanese footballer
, Japanese footballer
, Japanese footballer
, Japanese manga artist
, Japanese actor
, Japanese cyclist
, Japanese voice actress

Fictional characters
Inspector Shimura, a character in Judge Dredd Megazine
Rei Shimura, a character in a series of mystery novels by Sujata Massey
, a character in the manga series Gintama
Danzo Shimura, a character in Naruto
Nana Shimura, a character in My Hero Academia
Lord Shimura, a character in video game Ghost of Tsushima

Japanese-language surnames